Linda-Jean M. Williamson (born November 11, 1952) was an American politician.

Born in Chicago, Illinois, Williamson studied political science at Triton College. She served on the board of trustees for Leyden Township, Cook County, Illinois. She lived in Northlake, Illinois. From 1985 to 1991, Williamson served in the Illinois House of Representatives and was a Republican. She was defeated by fellow Northlake resident Geoffrey Obrzut.

Notes

1953 births
Living people
Politicians from Chicago
People from Northlake, Illinois
Triton College alumni
Women state legislators in Illinois
Republican Party members of the Illinois House of Representatives
21st-century American women